The Western Avenue Bridge is a bridge carrying Western Avenue over the Charles River between Cambridge and Allston, Massachusetts.  It was built in 1924 by the Commonwealth of Massachusetts Metropolitan District Commission.

The bridge carries one-way traffic going west, into Allston.  Eastbound traffic must take the nearby River Street Bridge.

History 
The original bridge on the site was the River Street Bridge (not to be confused with the modern River Street Bridge just down the river) constructed in 1824.

References

External links 

Bridges in Boston
Bridges completed in 1924
Buildings and structures in Cambridge, Massachusetts
Bridges in Middlesex County, Massachusetts
Road bridges in Massachusetts
Bridges over the Charles River
Arch bridges in the United States
1924 establishments in Massachusetts